I Heard You Twice the First Time is a jazz album by Branford Marsalis that explores different aspects of the blues, featuring guest appearances from B.B. King, John Lee Hooker, Russell Malone, Wynton Marsalis and Linda Hopkins. It peaked at number 1 on the Top Jazz Albums chart. The album won the Grammy Award for Best Jazz Instrumental Performance, Individual or Group.

Reception
In his AllMusic review, Scott Yanow calls the album "interesting if erratic," specifically identifying the performance by Linda Hopkins and concluding that this is an "intriguing set that is worth picking up." People praised the album, calling out the "four distinct blues-guitar styles" and the "verve and execution" of the quartet numbers as high points. Entertainment Weekly characterized Marsalis as "a commanding, even great, saxophonist of the post-hard-bop school, but a wayward conceptualist," and criticized the album as suffering from a "serious identity crisis."

Track listing

Personnel
 Branford Marsalis – Tenor, Alto and Soprano Saxophones, Vocals
 Kenny Kirkland - Piano
 Jeff "Tain" Watts - Drums
 Robert Hurst - Bass 
 B.B. King – Guitar, Vocals
 Russell Malone – Guitar
 Reginald Veal – Bass
 Herlin "Homey" Riley – Drums
 John Lee Hooker – Guitar, Vocals
 Wessel Anderson – Alto Saxophone
 Wynton Marsalis – Trumpet
 David Sagher – Trombone
 Joe Louis Walker – Guitars
 Earl Gardner – Trumpet
 Delfeayo Marsalis – Trombone
 Bernard Purdie – Drums
 T-Blade – Guitar
 Linda Hopkins – Vocals
 Thomas Hollis – Vocals
 Roscoe Carroll – Vocals
 Carl Gordon – Vocals
 Charles Dutton – Vocals
 Dwight Anderson – Musical Consultant, Conductor (Berta, Berta)

References

External links
 BranfordMarsalis.com 

Branford Marsalis albums
1992 albums
Albums produced by George Butler (record producer)
Grammy Award for Best Jazz Instrumental Album